Robert L. Shaw (November 27, 1865 – January 22, 1930) was a politician from Alberta, Canada.

Shaw was first elected to the Alberta Legislature in the 1909 Alberta general election. He defeated Conservative candidate J.K. Creighton in a landslide to become the first MLA for the new Stettler electoral district. As a Member of the Legislative Assembly, Shaw campaigned for a court house in Stettler, which was approved in 1913.

Shaw would be re-elected to a second term in the 1913 Alberta general election. He won that election with a plurality of just 21 votes over Conservative challenger George McMorris. Shaw would serve the remainder of his second term before retiring from provincial politics in 1917.

Shaw moved to Vancouver following the death of his spouse in 1924. Shaw died in Vancouver on January 22, 1930, at the age of 64.

References

External links
Legislative Assembly of Alberta Members Listing

Alberta Liberal Party MLAs
1865 births
1930 deaths